"Donne-moi ton cœur" is a song by French singer Louane, which is included in her third album Joie de vivre. The song was written and produced by Damso. The single was released on July 3, 2020, under the Mercury Records label. In 2020, Louane met Damso after his concert at the Olympia, which is when the artists decided to work together.

Charts

Weekly charts

Year-end charts

References

2020 songs
French-language songs
Louane (singer) songs
2020 singles